Triebel is a municipality in Saxony, Germany.

Triebel may also refer to:

 Jördis Triebel (born 1977), German actress
 Frederick Triebel (1865–1944), American sculptor
 Frédéric Triebel (born 1954), French immunologist
 Triebel-Lizorkin space, in mathematics, a general scale of function spaces